The following is an ongoing list of international trips made by Miguel Díaz-Canel, who held the office of President of the Cuban Council of State from 19 April 2018 to 10 October 2019, the President of Cuba since 10 October 2019 and has been the First Secretary of the Communist Party of Cuba (de facto leader) since 19 April 2021.

As President of the Council of State

2018

2019

As President of the Republic

2019

2021

2022

2023

References

Díaz-Canel
2018 in international relations
Foreign relations of Cuba
Díaz-Canel